El Salvador is a country in Central America. Situated at the meeting point of three tectonic plates, it is highly seismologically active and the location of numerous earthquakes and volcanic eruptions. The country has a tropical climate.

Plate tectonics 

El Salvador, along with the rest of Central America, is one of the most seismologically active regions on earth, situated atop three of the large tectonic plates that constitute the Earth's surface. The motion of these plates causes the area's earthquake and volcanic activity.

Most of Central America and the Caribbean Basin rests on the relatively motionless Caribbean Plate. The Pacific Ocean floor, however, is being carried northeast by the underlying motion of the Cocos Plate. Ocean floor material is largely composed of basalt, which is relatively dense; when it collides with the lighter granite rocks of Central America, the ocean floor is forced down under the land mass, creating the deep Middle America Trench that lies off the coast of El Salvador.

The subduction of the Cocos Plate accounts for the frequency of earthquakes near the coast. As the rocks constituting the ocean floor are forced down, they melt, and the molten material pours up through weaknesses in the surface rock, producing volcanoes and geysers.

North of El Salvador, Mexico and most of Guatemala are riding on the westward-moving North American Plate that butts against the northern edge of the stationary Caribbean Plate in southern Guatemala. The grinding action of these two plates creates a fault (similar to the San Andreas fault in California) that runs the length of the valley of the Rio Motagua in Guatemala. Motion along this fault is the source of earthquakes in northernmost El Salvador.

El Salvador has a long history of destructive earthquakes and volcanic eruptions. San Salvador was destroyed in 1756 and 1854, and  suffered heavy damage in the 1919, 1982, and 1986 tremors. The country has over twenty volcanoes, although only two, San Miguel and Izalco, have been active in recent years. From the early nineteenth century to the mid-1950s, Izalco erupted with a regularity that earned it the name "Lighthouse of the Pacific". Its brilliant flares were clearly visible for great distances at sea, and at night its glowing lava turned it into a brilliant luminous cone.

Physical features

Two parallel mountain ranges cross El Salvador to the west with a central plateau between them and a narrow coastal plain hugging the Pacific. These physical features divide the country into two physiographic regions. The mountain ranges and central plateau, covering 85 percent of the land, comprise the interior highlands. The remaining coastal plains are referred to as the Pacific lowlands.

The northern range of mountains, the Sierra Madre, form a continuous chain along the border with Honduras. Elevations in this region range from 1,600 to 2,700 meters. The area was once heavily forested, but overexploitation led to extensive erosion, and it has become semibarren. As a result, it is the country's most sparsely populated zone, with little farming or other development.

The southern range of mountains is actually a discontinuous chain of more than twenty volcanoes, clustered into five groups. The westernmost group, near the Guatemalan border, contains Izalco and Santa Ana, which at 2,365 meters is the highest volcano in El Salvador. Between the cones lie alluvial basins and rolling hills eroded from ash deposits. The volcanic soil is rich, and much of El Salvador's coffee is planted on these slopes.

The central plateau constitutes only 25 percent of the land area but contains the heaviest concentration of population and the country's largest cities. This plain is about 50 kilometers wide and has an average elevation of 600 meters. Terrain here is rolling, with occasional escarpments, lava fields, and geysers.

A narrow plain extends from the coastal volcanic range to the Pacific Ocean. This region has a width ranging from one to thirty-two kilometers with the widest section in the east, adjacent to the Golfo de Fonseca. Near La Libertad, however, the mass of the mountains push the lowlands out; the slopes of adjacent volcanoes come down directly to the ocean. Surfaces in the Pacific lowlands are generally flat or gently rolling and result from the alluvial deposits of nearby slopes.

El Salvador has over 300 rivers, the most important of which is the Rio Lempa. Originating in Guatemala, the Rio Lempa cuts across the northern range of mountains, flows along much of the central plateau, and finally cuts through the southern volcanic range to empty into the Pacific. It is El Salvador's only navigable river, it and its tributaries drain about half the country. Other rivers are generally short and drain the Pacific lowlands or flow from the central plateau through gaps in the southern mountain range to the Pacific.

Numerous lakes of volcanic origin are found in the interior highlands; many of these lakes are surrounded by mountains and have high, steep banks. The largest lake, the Lago de Ilopango, lies just to the east of the capital. Other large lakes include the Lago de Coatepeque in the west and the Lago de Güija on the Guatemalan border. The Cerron Grande Dam on the Rio Lempa has created a large reservoir, the Embalse Cerron Grande, in northern El Salvador.

Izalco has erupted at least 54 times since 1770. It earned the nickname "Lighthouse of the Pacific" because it served as a beacon for ships during the night.

Climate

El Salvador has a tropical climate with pronounced wet and dry seasons. Temperatures vary primarily with elevation and show little seasonal change. The Pacific lowlands are uniformly hot and humid; the central plateau and mountain areas are more moderate.

The rainy season, known locally as invierno, or winter, extends from May to October. Protected areas and the central plateau receive lesser, although still significant, amounts. Rainfall during this season generally comes from low pressure over the Pacific and usually falls in heavy afternoon thunderstorms. Although hurricanes occasionally form in the Pacific, they seldom affect El Salvador, with the notable exception of Hurricane Mitch in 1998 (which actually formed over the Atlantic Basin) and Hurricane Emily in 1973.

From November through April, the northeast trade winds control weather patterns. During these months, air flowing from the Caribbean has lost most of its precipitation while passing over the mountains in Honduras. By the time this air reaches El Salvador, it is dry, hot, and hazy. This season is known locally as verano, or summer.

Temperatures vary little with season; elevation is the primary determinant.

Other facts

The total land area of El Salvador is 23,041 km2, with 20,721 km2 of land and 320 km2 of water. El Salvador is about the size of Israel and the U.S states of New Jersey and Vermont, but has the population size of Libya and Lebanon. El Salvador has 590 km of borders, including 391 km of borders with Honduras and 199 km with Guatemala. El Salvador has a coastline of 307 km.

The lowest point of elevation in El Salvador is the Pacific Ocean, at sea level. The highest point is Cerro El Pital, at 2,730 m.

Maritime claims:
Exclusive economic zone:

Natural resources:
Hydropower, geothermal power, petroleum, arable land

Land use (2012 estimate) includes 34.03 percent arable land, 10.86 percent permanent crops,  55.12 percent other.

Irrigated land:
449.9 km2 (2003)

Total renewable water resources:
25.23 km3 (2011)

Natural hazards:
El Salvador is known as the "Land of Volcanoes"; there are frequent and sometimes very destructive earthquakes and volcanic activity; hurricanes rarely make direct landfall.

Extreme points
 Northernmost point – north of El Limo, Santa Ana Department
 Southernmost point – El Jaguey, La Unión Department
 Westernmost point – border with Guatemala, Ahuachapán Department
 Easternmost point – island of Meanguera del Golfo, La Unión Department
 Highest point – Cerro El Pital: 2730 m
 Lowest point – Pacific Ocean: 0 m

Environmental issues
Deforestation; soil erosion; water pollution; contamination of soils from disposal of toxic wastes.

El Salvador is party to the Convention on Biological Diversity, United Nations Framework Convention on Climate Change, Kyoto Protocol to the United Nations Framework Convention on Climate Change, United Nations Convention to Combat Desertification, CITES, Basel Convention, Partial Test Ban Treaty, Montreal Protocol, Ramsar Convention. El Salvador has signed, but not ratified the United Nations Convention on the Law of the Sea.

References